Standard Motor Products, Inc. (NYSE: SMP) is a manufacturer and distributor of automotive parts in the automotive aftermarket industry. The company was founded in 1919 as a partnership by Elias Fife and Ralph Van Allen and incorporated by Fife in 1926. It is headquartered in Long Island City, New York, and trades on the New York Stock Exchange.

Standard Motor Products, Inc. sells its products to warehouse distributors and auto parts retail chains around the world, under its own brand names such as Standard, BWD Automotive, Blue Streak Automotive, Blue Streak Wire, TechSmart, Intermotor, Factory Air, and Four Seasons, as well as under private labels for key customers.

History
Standard Motor Products was founded in Manhattan in 1919 as a partnership between Elias Fife, a Jewish immigrant from Lithuania, and Ralph Van Allen. Originally the company specialized in ignition and electrical parts. In 1920 Van Allen opened a Standard Motor Products branch in Seattle. In 1921 the company moved to the Long Island City section of Queens. The partnership dissolved in 1925 and in 1926 the company was incorporated with Fife as the sole proprietor. Van Allen operated a separate company in Los Angeles under the same name and logo until selling it to Fife in 1936. That year the company also moved into the Art Deco building where it is still headquartered. SMP has steadily grown with the automative age, evolving from ten employees to 3,500.

The Blue Streak line of premium ignition parts was introduced in the 1930s. In 1947 Standard acquired Hygrade Products Co. The product line was expanded to include speedometer cables, carburetor repair parts, shock-absorber parts, and fuel pumps. In 1950 Standard introduced the Hygrade System, simplified carburetor kits for tune-ups and light overhauls.

Standard Motor Products had its Initial public offering in 1960 and was listed on the New York Stock Exchange (NYSE) in 1977. In 1963 it entered the wholesale parts market with a new subsidiary, Marathon Parts. Beginning in the late 1960s under Lawrence "Larry" Sills, Fife's grandson, Standard acquired several rival businesses. In July 1997 it exchanged its brake business for Cooper Industries' temperature control business. The company funded acquisitions by taking out loans and selling stock;  less than 10% remains family-owned. In the financial crisis of the late 2000s, the company had to retrench and sold its headquarters building for $40.6 million. The space was previously a manufacturing site producing items like distributor caps, but because of modern engine designs the workforce there dwindled over the years. The remaining Long Island City manufacturing operations were moved to its plant in Reynosa, Mexico, and Independence, Kansas. On July 29, 2009, Chairman Sills rang the closing bell at the New York Stock Exchange to celebrate the company's 90th anniversary.

In January 2014, the company acquired the assets of Pensacola Fuel Injection.

Operations and products
The company has two operational segments, an Engine Management segment that produces parts for fuel systems, ignition and emissions, ignition wires, and battery cables, and a Temperature Control Segment that manufactures and refurbishes air-conditioning, heating, engine cooling system, and windshield washer parts, air-conditioning compressors, and power window accessories. Its subsidiaries include Four Seasons Europe S.A.R.L. (in France), Marathon Auto Parts and Products, Inc., Motortronics, Inc., SMP Motor Products Limited (in Canada), Standard Motor Products Holdings Limited (in England and Wales), Standard Motor Products (Hong Kong) Limited, and Standard Motor Products de Mexico.

The company sells to automotive stores and wholesalers. It manufactures approximately half of the parts it sells; most of the rest it imports from China.

Some Standard products are sold under private labels, including CARQUEST, Cold Power, Duralast, Duralast Gold, Import Direct, Master Pro, Mileage Plus, Murray, and NAPA (NAPA Belden, NAPA Echlin, NAPA Temp Products). The company's own brands include Standard, BWD/NIEHOFF, Intermotor, OEM, LockSmart, TechSmart, and GP Sorensen for engine management and Four Seasons, Factory Air, EVERCO, ACi, Imperial, COMPRESSORWORKS, TORQFLO, and Hayden  for temperature control.

Sales
Standard Motor Products was listed as one of Crain's New York Business top 250 publicly held companies for 2012, and as number 94 in the Forbes list of America's best small companies in 2013. That year the company's earnings were $969 million with 4% sales growth and 61% earnings per share growth. The company also received a positive review that year for its cash conversion cycle from an analyst at The Motley Fool.

References

External links 
 SMP Corporate
Standard
BWD
Blue Streak Automotive
Blue Streak Wire
TechSmart Parts
Intermotor
Factory Air
4Seasons

Auto parts suppliers of the United States
Manufacturing companies based in New York City
Manufacturing companies established in 1919